General Noble may refer to:

Alfred H. Noble (1894–1983), U.S. Marine Corps general
Charles C. Noble (1916–2003), U.S. Army major general
Robert Houston Noble (1861–1939), U.S. Army brigadier general
Roger Noble (born 1966), Australian Army major general